Wauconda High School, officially Wauconda Community High School, and most commonly WHS, is a public four-year high school located in Wauconda, Illinois, a northern suburb of Chicago, Illinois, in the United States. It is part of Wauconda Community Unit School District 118.

History
Wauconda High School first opened its doors in September 1915.

Academics
In 2007, Wauconda had an average composite ACT score of 19.9, and graduated 97.6% of its senior class (compared to the state average of 85.9%). The average class size is 20.4. Wauconda has made Adequate Yearly Progress on the Prairie State Achievements Examination, a state test part of the No Child Left Behind Act.

The staff consists of 117 teachers. 59% of teachers hold an advanced degree.

Athletics
Wauconda competes in the Northern Lake County Conference and Illinois High School Association. The school's teams compete as the Bulldogs, and its colors are purple and gold. The following sports are offered at Wauconda:

Baseball (boys)
Basketball (boys & girls)
Bowling (girls)
Competitive cheerleading (girls)
Competitive dance (girls)
Cross country (boys & girls)
Football (boys)
Golf (boys & girls)
Soccer (boys & girls)
Softball (girls)
Tennis (boys & girls)
Track & field (boys & girls) 
Volleyball (girls)
Wrestling (boys)

Alumni

Dr Manhattan, Rock Band
Grace Lynn Keller,(class of 2017), Miss Iowa 2021, will compete at the 100th anniversary Miss America Competition in December 2021 representing Iowa.

References

External links
 Official website

Public high schools in Illinois
Educational institutions established in 1958
Schools in Lake County, Illinois
1958 establishments in Illinois